Sultan Al-Dossari  (born 1 January 1990) is a Saudi football player who currently plays as a midfielder for Al-Sharq.

References

External links
 
 Sultan Al-Dossari at Footballdatabase

1989 births
Living people
Saudi Arabian footballers
Al-Wehda Club (Mecca) players
Al-Ahli Saudi FC players
Al-Faisaly FC players
Al-Shoulla FC players
Najran SC players
Al-Qadsiah FC players
Arar FC players
Al-Nahda Club (Saudi Arabia) players
Al-Sharq Club players
Saudi Professional League players
Saudi First Division League players
Saudi Second Division players
Association football midfielders